New Neely is an unincorporated community in Yell County, Arkansas, United States, located on Arkansas Highway 154,  south-southeast of Dardanelle.

References

Unincorporated communities in Yell County, Arkansas
Unincorporated communities in Arkansas